Paavolainen is a Finnish language patronymic surname derived from the first name Paavo. Notable people with the surname include:

Pekka Paavolainen (1868–1930), Finnish lawyer, civil servant and politician
Erkki Paavolainen (1890–1930), Finnish journalist, educationist and politician
Jaakko Paavolainen (1927–2007), Finnish historian

References

Finnish-language surnames
Patronymic surnames